Eric Griffin (born November 3, 1967)) is an American former professional boxer. As an amateur, he won gold medals at the 1989 and 1991 World Championships.

Amateur career
As an amateur, Griffin was the co-captain of the 1992 USA Olympic Team.

Amateur Highlights 
1987 Golden Glove Nationals 106lbs Finals Defeated Armando Martinez (Southern California) by points
1989 World Champion at Light Flyweight in competition in Moscow. Results were:
Defeated Gonzalez (Mexico) TKO
Defeated Dok-Nam Kim (North Korea) points
Defeated Rogelio Marcelo (Cuba) points
1990 Light Flyweight Gold Medalist at Goodwill Games in Seattle. Results were:
Defeated Alcibel Flores (Venezuela) points
Defeated Nshan Munchian (Soviet Union) points
Defeated Anatoly Filippov (Soviet Union) points
1991 United States Amateur Light Flyweight champion
1991 World Champion at Light Flyweight in competition in Sydney. Results were:
Defeated Dong-Bum Cho (South Korea) points
Defeated Tsogtjargal Erdenetsogt (Mongolia) KO 3
Defeated Nelson Dieppa (Puerto Rico) points
Defeated Rogelio Marcelo (Cuba) points

Olympic Results 
Qualified as a Light Flyweight at the United States Olympic Trials. Results were:
Defeated Bradley Martinez points
Defeated James Harris points
Defeated Mario Bueno points
Defeated Bradley Martinez (points), at Olympic Box-Offs
Competed as a Light Flyweight at 1992 Barcelona Olympic Games. Results were
Defeated Fausto Rosario (Dominican Republic) points
Lost to Rafael Lozano (Spain) points

Professional career
Griffin turned pro in 1992 and had a disappointing career.  He retired in 1997 after being TKO'd in his first and only title shot, a bout for the vacant WBO light flyweight title against Jesus Chong, having won 16 and lost 4 in his pro career.

References
 
 

1967 births
Living people
Boxers from Louisiana
Flyweight boxers
Boxers at the 1992 Summer Olympics
Olympic boxers of the United States
Winners of the United States Championship for amateur boxers
Sportspeople from Lafayette, Louisiana
American male boxers
AIBA World Boxing Championships medalists
Competitors at the 1990 Goodwill Games